Anacrusis erioheir is a species of moth of the family Tortricidae. It is found in Ecuador (Morona-Santiago Province and Napo Province).

The ground colour of the forewings is cream, tinged slightly with ferruginous at the base dorsally, along the costal arm of the median cell and medioterminally. The hindwings are cream, somewhat tinged with ochreous in the basal portion and with pale brownish grey distally.

Etymology
The species name refers to termination of the uncus and is derived from Greek erio (meaning a strengthening prefix, meaning very and heir (meaning claw)).

References

External links

Moths described in 2006
Endemic fauna of Ecuador
Atteriini
Moths of South America
Taxa named by Józef Razowski